Steven Joseph Bartkowski (born November 12, 1952) is an American former professional football player who was a quarterback in the National Football League (NFL) for the Atlanta Falcons (1975–1985) and the Los Angeles Rams (1986). He was a two-time Pro Bowl selection. Bartkowski played college football for the California Golden Bears, earning consensus All-American honors as a senior in 1974.

College career
Bartkowski attended the University of California, Berkeley. In 1972, he threw for 944 yards with four touchdowns and 13 interceptions. In 1973, he threw for 910 yards with four touchdowns and seven interceptions.  As a senior with the Golden Bears in 1974, Bartkowski was a consensus All-American and led the nation in passing. He threw for 2,580 yards, 12 touchdowns, and seven interceptions. He completed 182 passes out of 325 attempts.  In addition to playing football, Bartkowski was also an All-American baseball player at first base for the Bears.

Professional career
Bartkowski was chosen with the first overall pick in the 1975 NFL Draft by the Atlanta Falcons (after the Falcons acquired the pick in a trade with the Colts). Bartkowski was the NFL Rookie of the Year as well as The Sporting News NFC Rookie of the Year in 1975. He was the first client of sports agent Leigh Steinberg.

Bartkowski is one of ten quarterbacks in NFL history who have achieved consecutive 30-touchdown passing seasons (1980 and 1981) at least one time in their career. Bartkowski was selected to the Pro Bowl after both the 1980 and 1981 seasons and was selected 2nd Team All-NFC following the 1980 campaign. Bartkowski led the NFL in passing in 1983 with a passer rating of 97.6. Bartkowski set the record for consecutive games with at least three touchdown passes at home with five which he established over the 1980 and 1981 seasons. The record was held until the 2004 season when it was surpassed by Peyton Manning.

In 1984, Bartkowski started the Falcons' first 11 games, but was injured late in the season and replaced by Mike Moroski.  Bartkowski began 1985 as the starter, but an 0-5 start led to his benching and losing the job to David Archer.  The Falcons cut him at season's end.

The Los Angeles Rams signed Bartkowski in the 1986 pre-season when holdover Dieter Brock suffered a season- (and career-) ending injury.  Bartkowski started six of the Rams' first seven games and the team was 4-2 in those games, but Bartkowski was largely ineffective and lost the starting job to Steve Dils.  The Rams would eventually turn the reins over to rookie Jim Everett.  Bartkowski retired after the 1986 season.

Bartkowski was inducted into the Georgia Sports Hall of Fame on May 19, 2007.

Post NFL career
Bartkowski is currently on the Falcons Board of Advisors. He has a wife, Sandee, and two sons, Philip and Peter, and resides outside Atlanta. Bartkowski's elder son, Philip is married to Robin Fortin, the sister of former Falcons lineman Roman Fortin. In 1993, Bartkowski was inducted into the National Polish American Sports Hall of Fame  and in 2012, he was inducted into the College Football Hall of Fame.

See also
 List of college football yearly passing leaders

References

External links
 

1952 births
Living people
American football quarterbacks
Atlanta Falcons players
California Golden Bears football players
Los Angeles Rams players
All-American college football players
College Football Hall of Fame inductees
National Conference Pro Bowl players
National Football League first-overall draft picks
Sportspeople from Santa Clara, California
Players of American football from California
Players of American football from Des Moines, Iowa